The Pechmann condensation is a synthesis of coumarins, starting from a phenol and a carboxylic acid or ester containing a β-carbonyl group.  The condensation is performed under acidic conditions.  The mechanism involves an esterification/transesterification followed by attack of the activated carbonyl ortho to the oxygen to generate the new ring.  The final step is a dehydration, as seen following an aldol condensation. It was discovered by the German chemist Hans von Pechmann
.

With simple phenols, the conditions are harsh, although yields may still be good.

With highly activated phenols such as resorcinol, the reaction can be performed under much milder conditions.  This provides a useful route to umbelliferone derivatives:

For coumarins unsubstituted at the 4-position, the method requires the use of formylacetic acid or ester.  These are unstable and not commercially available, but the acid may be produced in situ from malic acid and sulfuric acid above 100 °C.  As soon as it forms, the formylacetic acid performs the Pechmann condensation.  In the example shown, umbelliferone itself is produced, albeit in low yield:

Mechanistic studies
The mechanism of the reaction has been studied in details with theoretical treatment.

The study shown that reaction takes place on oxo-form, and not on enolic-form. Three different oxo-routes have been proposed.

Simonis chromone cyclization
In a variation the reaction of phenols and beta-ketoesters and phosphorus pentoxide yields a chromone. This reaction is called Simonis chromone cyclization. The ketone in the ketoester is activated by P2O5 for reaction with the phenol hydroxyl group first, the ester group in it is then activated for electrophilic attack of the arene.

See also 
Aldol condensation
Kostanecki acylation
Perkin reaction

References 

Oxygen heterocycle forming reactions
Condensation reactions
Name reactions